The Southern Hotshots are a men's Australian field hockey team, representing South Australia in the Australian Hockey League.

The 4,000-capacity State Hockey Centre is their home stadium.

Notable players
Notable players who have played for the Southern Hotshots include:
Paul Lewis
Grant Schubert
Craig Victory

Coaches
Head Coaches of the SA Hotshots have been:
Melody Cooper from 2014-2016 Co-Head Coach with Mark Victory

Home Stadium
The team's home stadium is the State Hockey Centre (South Australia) (also known as the Pines Stadium) which is located north of the Adelaide CBD in Gepps Cross. The stadium has a capacity of about 4,000 with 330 permanent seats. The stadium was used for the 1997 Men's Hockey Champions Trophy.

Honour Roll

References

Australian field hockey clubs
Sports teams in South Australia